BIDU or Bidu may refer to:

Places
 Bidu, Dashtestan, Bushehr, Iran
 Bidu, Deylam, Bushehr, Iran
 Bidu, Jam, Bushehr, Iran
 Bidu, Anarestan, Jam, Bushehr, Iran
 Bidu, Shahr-e Babak, Kerman, Iran
 Bidu, Yazd, Iran
 Bidu (woreda), Ethiopia

Other uses
 Bidu (god), gatekeeper of the underworld in Mesopotamian mythology
 Bidu Cola, Argentinian cola soft drink, also marketed in other countries, including Curaçao (Netherlands Antilles)
 Bidu Sayão (1902–1999), Brazilian opera soprano
 BIDU, the NASDAQ ticker symbol for Baidu
 Blu (Monica's Gang) (known as Bidu in Brazil), a character in Monica's Gang media
 Bidu (footballer) (Matheus Lima Beltrão Oliveira), Brazilian footballer

See also
 Biddu Appaiah (born 1944), Anglo-Indian musician
 Biddu, Jerusalem